Dingxi railway station is a station on Longhai railway in Dingxi, Gansu.

References

Railway stations in Gansu
Stations on the Longhai Railway